The year 1843 in architecture involved some significant events.

Buildings and structures

Buildings

 March 25 – The Thames Tunnel in London, constructed by Isambard Kingdom Brunel and Marc Isambard Brunel, the oldest underwater tunnel in the world, opens to the public.
 Nelson's Column in London, designed by William Railton, is completed.
 McGill University's original building, later known as the Arts Building, is completed in Montreal by architect John Ostell.

Awards
 Grand Prix de Rome, architecture: Jacques-Martin Tétaz.

Births
 July 6 – Robert S. Roeschlaub, German-born architect working in Colorado (died 1923)
 November 29 – Gertrude Jekyll, English garden designer (died 1932)

Deaths
 January 13 – Peter Atkinson, English-born architect (born 1776)

References

Architecture
Years in architecture
19th-century architecture